Fox's U-bet chocolate syrup is a commercial chocolate syrup originally made by H. Fox & Company in Brooklyn, New York starting in 1900. The product is most associated with the egg cream fountain beverage.  H. Fox & Company was acquired by US Westminster Foods in 2016.

Fox's is often cited in recipes for egg creams in the New York area. Both U-Bet and Bosco, another brand with NY/NJ roots, use real cocoa.

See also
 List of syrups

References

Cuisine of New York City
Brand name chocolate
Syrup
Products introduced in 1895
Kosher food